Mayara Nabosne Harendt (born 3 August 2001) is a Brazilian professional footballer who plays as a goalkeeper for Internacional.

Club career
Born in Curitiba, Paraná, Mayara played for local side Imperial-PR before joining Internacional for the 2019 season.

In July 2021, despite being backup option, Mayara renewed her contract with Inter. She became a starter in the 2022 season.

International career
After representing Brazil at under-17 and under-20 levels, Mayara received her first call up for the full side on 18 March 2022.

References

2001 births
Living people
Footballers from Curitiba
Brazilian women's footballers
Women's association football goalkeepers
Campeonato Brasileiro de Futebol Feminino Série A1 players
Sport Club Internacional (women) players